Asian Vision Cable Holdings, Inc. (Asian Vision) is a telecommunications company in the Philippines. Founded in 1972 by Ramon "Jun" Magsaysay Jr., it was the second commercial cable television service in the country as Colorview CATV in Zambales.

Asian Vision has a number of subscribers covering areas in Zambales, Batangas and Quezon, offering cable television and broadband internet services.

History
After the cable television industry in the Philippines began in 1969 with the founding of Nuvue Cablevision (founded by American expatriate Russel Swartley) in Baguio, businessman Ramon "Jun" Magsaysay Jr. (son of the late President Ramon Magsaysay) followed the footsteps of Swartley's legacy. After spending his 4-year tenure as Congressman representing the lone district of Zambales and returned to work in the private sector, he founded Colorvision CATV in Olongapo, Zambales.

In 1977, Magsaysay expanded his cable business into the Southern Tagalog region with the establishment of Quezon CATV in Lucena. In 1986, after the historic EDSA People Power Revolution where Corazon Aquino was elected president and toppled the regime of Ferdinand Marcos, Magsaysay established Batangas CATV in Batangas City. At the same time, he led a group of other cable television owners to form the Philippine Cable and Telecommunications Association (PCTA). Aquino later signed Executive No. 205 in 1987, which paved way for the liberalization of cable TV industry.

In 1995, Magsaysay stepped down as the company president to run for the Senatorial race. His son, Francisco "Paco" Magsaysay, took over his position.

In 2005, it began venturing into broadband internet services with the launch of Click Internet.

In 2011, all three companies under the Asian Vision group were reformed under a unified brand called myCATV. In 2019, myCATV was renamed as Asian Vision.

List of service areas

References

Cable television companies of the Philippines
Mass media companies established in 1973
1973 establishments in the Philippines